This is a list of festivals held within Morocco.

List of festivals in Morocco
Arts in Marrakech (AiM) International Biennale
Atlas Electronic
Candles Convoy or wax procession of Salé
Gnaoua World Music Festival
International Film Festival of Marrakech
Mawazine Music Festival
Merzouga International Music Festival
World Sacred Music Festival
Imilchil Wedding Festival
Sefrou cherry festival
International festival of nomads in M'hamid El Ghizlane

See also
 Culture of Morocco
 Moroccan music

References

External links

Calendar of festivals in Morocco 

 
 
 
 L
 Festivals
Morocco
Morocco
Festivals